This is a list of major battles fought by the Peruvian Navy since its creation in 1821.

Gran Colombia-Peru War (1828-1829) 

 Battle of Punta Malpelo (August 31, 1828)
 Battle of Cruces (November 22, 1828)

War of the Peru-Bolivian Confederation (1835-1839) 

 Battle of Islay (January 12, 1838)
 Battle of Casma (January 12, 1839)

Chincha Islands War (1865-1866) 

 Battle of Abtao (February 7, 1866)
 Battle of Callao (May 2, 1866)

Piérola Uprising (1877) 

 Battle of Pacocha (May 6, 1877)

War of the Pacific (1879-1883) 

 Battle of Chipana (April 12, 1879)
 Battle of Iquique (May 21, 1879)
 Battle of Punta Gruesa (May 21, 1879)
 Battle of Angamos (October 8, 1879)

War with Colombia (1911) 

 Battle of La Pedrera (July 10–12, 1911)

Sources
Basadre, Jorge, Historia de la República del Perú. Editorial Universitaria, 1983.

Peru
Peruvian Navy
Navy, battles
battles